Black Wind, White Land  is a 1993 documentary film, researched and produced by the founders of the Chernobyl Children's Project International and explores the Chernobyl nuclear disaster of 1986 and its consequences for the handicapped development of the people in Belarus, Russia and Ukraine. The film was directed by Gene Kerrigan and produced by Ali Hewson, the wife of U2's singer Bono.

Background

Chernobyl Children's Project International was founded in Ireland in 1991 by Adi Roche in response to an appeal from Ukrainian and Belarusian doctors for aid. As a result of the organization's work, two documentaries have been released; Black Wind, White Land and  Chernobyl Heart. Black Wind, White Land highlights the plight of fallout victims of the Chernobyl event.

Ali Hewson's involvement with Greenpeace protests against the Sellafield plant for nuclear reprocessing led her to become interested in the Chernobyl nuclear disaster of 1986. After a request by activist Adi Roche, she went to blighted, high-radiation exclusion zones in Belarus for three weeks to narrate part of the documentary.

Reception and critical responses

Black Wind, White Land, was shown on RTÉ. Hot Press magazine wrote that Hewson had "obvious gifts as a presenter, which include a sense of quiet compassion that draws forth the best from the people she talks with." Another reviewer said that the documentary was very effective until she started speaking. Hewson was against the accusations about being used on the project because of her husband's fame.

See also
 List of Chernobyl-related charities

References

External links

Chernobyl International
Chernobyl Children's Project International

1993 films
English-language Irish films
Irish documentary films
Documentary films about the Chernobyl disaster
1993 documentary films
1990s English-language films